Minon John (born 12 February 2000) is an Indian actor and artist, from Kerala, who works in Malayalam films.

He won the National Film Award for Best Child Artist in 2012 for the Malayalam film 101 Chodyangal. It was directed by Sidhartha Siva and produced by Thomas Kottackakom. Minon also received the Kerala State Film Award for Best Child Artist and Kerala State Film Critics Award for the same role, in which he portrays a class five student.

Minon has held more than 80 painting exhibitions so far, all across India, and he has over 3,500 paintings to his credit.

Early life
Minon and his sister Mintu are trained painters by their artist parents, John Baby and Mini.

Filmography

Web series

Awards

 2012 - National Film Award for Best Child Artist for 101 Chodyangal
 2012 - Kerala State Film Award for Best Child Artist for 101 Chodyangal
 2012 - Kerala State Film Critics Award for Best Child Artist for 101 Chodyangal
 2012 - Harlem International Film Festival Awards for Best Actor for 101 Chodyangal

References

External links 

 Minon John On Facebook

Male actors from Alappuzha
Living people
2000 births
21st-century Indian male child actors
Male actors in Malayalam cinema
Indian male film actors
Best Child Artist National Film Award winners